Jeremy John Nel  (born 21 September 1934) is a South African former rugby union player.

Playing career

Nel toured with the Springboks to Australia and New Zealand in 1956. He played in all six test matches during the tour with his debut against  at the Sydney Cricket Ground, scoring a try on debut. In 1958 he played two test matches against . Nel played eight test matches and fifteen tour matches for the Springboks, scoring one test try and also twenty nine points in tour matches, including 8 tries.

Test history

See also
List of South Africa national rugby union players – Springbok no. 329

References

1934 births
Living people
South African rugby union players
South Africa international rugby union players
Leopards (rugby union) players
Eastern Province Elephants players
Western Province (rugby union) players
Boland Cavaliers players
Golden Lions players
Free State Cheetahs players
Rugby union players from Gauteng
Rugby union centres
Rugby union fly-halves